Isocoma felgeri is a rare Mexican plant species in the family Asteraceae. It has been found in the State of Sonora, in desert scrub near Bahía de Kino.

Isocoma felgeri is a shrub up to 120 cm (4 feet) tall. The plant produces flower heads in clusters on the tips of branches, each head containing 8-11 disc flowers but no ray flowers.

References

felgeri
Endemic flora of Mexico
Flora of Sonora
Plants described in 1991